The Hôtel de Ville (City Hall) is the city hall of Paris, France, standing on the Place de l'Hôtel-de-Ville – Esplanade de la Libération in the 4th arrondissement. The south wing was originally constructed by François I beginning in 1535 until 1551. The north wing was built by Henry IV and Louis XIII between 1605 and 1628. It was burned by the Paris Commune, along with all the city archives that it contained, during the Semaine Sanglante, the Commune's final days, in May 1871. The outside was rebuilt following the original design, but larger, between 1874 and 1882, while the inside was considerably modified. It has been the headquarters of the municipality of Paris since 1357. It serves multiple functions, housing the local government council, since 1977 the Mayors of Paris and their cabinets, and also serves as a venue for large receptions.

History

The original building

In July 1357, Étienne Marcel, provost of the merchants (i.e. mayor) of Paris, bought the so-called maison aux piliers ("House of Pillars") in the name of the municipality on the gently sloping shingle beach which served as a river port for unloading wheat and wood and later merged into a square, the Place de Grève ("Strand Square"), a place where Parisians often gathered, particularly for public executions. Ever since 1357, the City of Paris's administration has been located on the same location where the Hôtel de Ville stands today. Before 1357, the city administration was located in the so-called parloir aux bourgeois ("Parlour of Burgesses") near the Châtelet.

In 1533, King Francis I decided to endow the city with a city hall which would be worthy of Paris, then the largest city of Europe and Christendom. He appointed two architects: Italian Dominique de Cortone, nicknamed Boccador because of his red beard, and Frenchman Pierre Chambiges. The House of Pillars was torn down and Boccador, steeped in the spirit of the Renaissance, drew up the plans of a building which was at the same time tall, spacious, full of light and refined. Building work was not finished until 1628 during the reign of Louis XIII.

During the next two centuries, no changes were made to the edifice which was the stage for several famous events during the French Revolution. On 14 July 1789, the last provost of the merchants Jacques de Flesselles was murdered by an angry crowd. On 27 July 1794, Maximilien Robespierre attempted to commit suicide following a coup and was arrested along with his followers.

In 1835, on the initiative of Rambuteau, préfet of the Seine département, two wings were added to the main building and were linked to the facade by a gallery, to provide more space for the expanded city government. The architects were Étienne-Hippolyte Godde and Jean-Baptiste Lesueur.

The Paris Commune
During the Franco-Prussian War, the building played a key role in several political events. On 30 October 1870, revolutionaries broke into the building and captured some of the members of the Government of National Defence, while making repeated demands for the establishment of a communard government. The existing government escaped via a tunnel built in 1807, which still connects the Hôtel de Ville with a nearby barracks. On 23 January 1871, crowds gathered outside the building to protest against speculated surrender to the Prussians, and were dispersed by soldiers firing from the building, who inflicted several casualties.

The Hôtel de Ville had been the headquarters of the French Revolution, and likewise, it was the headquarters of the Paris Commune. When defeat became increasingly imminent and the French army approached the building, the Communards set fire to the Hôtel de Ville, along with other government buildings, destroying the building and almost all of the city archives.

Reconstruction

Reconstruction of City Hall lasted from 1873 through 1892 (19 years) and was directed by architects Théodore Ballu and Édouard Deperthes, who had won the public competition for the building's reconstruction. Ballu also designed the Church of La Trinité in the 9th arrondissement and the belfry of the town hall of the 1st arrondissement, opposite the Louvre's east facade. He also restored the Saint-Jacques Tower, a Gothic church tower in a square 150 metres to the west of the Hôtel de Ville.

The architects rebuilt the interior of the Hôtel de Ville within the stone shell that had survived the fire. While the rebuilt Hôtel de Ville from the outside appeared to be a copy of the 16th-century French Renaissance building that stood before 1871, the new interior was based on an entirely new design, with ceremonial rooms lavishly decorated in the 1880s style.

The central ceremonial doors under the clock are flanked by allegorical figures of Art, by Laurent Marqueste, and Science, by Jules Blanchard. Some 230 other sculptors were commissioned to produce 338 individual figures of famous Parisians on each facade, along with lions and other sculptural features. The sculptors included prominent academicians like Ernest-Eugène Hiolle and Henri Chapu, but easily the most famous was Auguste Rodin. Rodin produced the figure of the 18th-century mathematician Jean le Rond d'Alembert, finished in 1882.

The statue on the garden wall on the south side is of Étienne Marcel, the most famous holder of the post of prévôt des marchands (provost of the merchants) which predated the office of mayor. Marcel was lynched in 1358 by an angry mob after trying to assert the city's powers too energetically.

The decor featured murals by the leading painters of the day, including Raphaël Collin, Henri-Camille Danger, Jean-Paul Laurens, Puvis de Chavannes, Léon Bonnat, Albert Besnard, Henri Gervex, Aimé Morot or Alfred Roll. Most can still be seen as part of a guided tour of the building.

Political venue
Since the French Revolution, the building has been the scene of a number of historical events, notably the proclamation of the French Third Republic in 1870 and a speech by Charles de Gaulle on 25 August 1944 during the Liberation of Paris when he greeted a crowd from a front window.

The previous mayor, Bertrand Delanoë, a socialist and the city's first openly gay leader, was stabbed in the building in 2002 during the first all-night, citywide Sleepless Night (Nuit Blanche; literally, White Night) festival when the doors of the long-inaccessible building were thrown open to the public. But Delanoë recovered and has not lost his zeal for access, later converting the mayor's sumptuous private apartments into a crèche (day nursery) for the children of municipal workers.

Nearby places
The northern (left) side of the building is located on the Rue de Rivoli. The nearby Bazar de l'Hôtel de Ville (BHV) is a department store named after the Hôtel de Ville. The closest church to the Hôtel de Ville is the St-Gervais-et-St-Protais Church.

See also
 List of town halls in Paris
 Lost artworks
 Place de Grève

References

Bibliography

Books cited in the text
}

External links

 Paris city hall website
 CityMayors.com feature
 Opening hours and temporary exhibitions information in English

Buildings and structures in Paris
City and town halls in France
Government of Paris
Buildings and structures in the 4th arrondissement of Paris
French Renaissance Revival architecture